John Michael Fulkerson (born April 29, 1997) is an American professional basketball player for Leuven Bears of the BNXT League.

High school career
In his first two years of high school, Fulkerson played basketball for Dobyns-Bennett High School in his hometown of Kingsport, Tennessee, before transferring to Christ School in Arden, North Carolina to gain more exposure. As a junior, he averaged 10 points, 6.1 rebounds and 2.8 blocks per game, tying a school record with 93 blocks. In his senior season, Fulkerson averaged 14.5 points, 11.1 rebounds, 4.3 assists and 3.5 blocks per game, breaking Marshall Plumlee's school single-season blocks record with 112. He earned NCISAA 3-A All-State accolades and was named Carolinas Athletic Association Player of the Year.

Recruiting
Fulkerson was considered a three-star recruit by 247Sports and Rivals. On November 6, 2015, he committed to play college basketball for Tennessee over 20 other NCAA Division I programs, including Georgia and Clemson. He was drawn to the Volunteers because he had grown up supporting the team.

College career

On November 22, 2016, in his first season at Tennessee, Fulkerson recorded 12 points, 10 rebounds and five blocks in a 69–65 overtime loss to 13th-ranked Oregon. On December 15 against Lipscomb, he fractured his right wrist and dislocated his right elbow, sidelining him for the remainder of the season. Fulkerson underwent surgery for the injury and was granted a medical redshirt. Before playing another game, he suffered a torn labrum in his left shoulder that required another surgery. In his following season, as a redshirt freshman, Fulkerson averaged 9.3 minutes per game. In his sophomore season, he served as Tennessee's primary frontcourt player off the bench. On December 29, 2018, Fulkerson scored a season-high 15 points in a 96–53 win over Tennessee Tech. As a sophomore, he averaged 3.1 points and 2.6 rebounds per game.

In his junior season, Fulkerson was placed in a more important role with the departures of Grant Williams and Kyle Alexander. On February 15, 2020, Fulkerson posted 25 points in a 63–61 loss to South Carolina. On March 3, he scored a career-high 27 points to help unranked Tennessee overcome a 17-point deficit and upset sixth-ranked Kentucky, 81–73. Fulkerson finished the season averaging 13.7 points and 5.9 rebounds per game and was named to the Second Team All-Southeastern Conference (SEC) by the league's coaches. He led his team in scoring, rebounding and steals, while shooting 61.2 percent from the field, which ranked second in the SEC and fourth in school history. 

Fulkerson suffered a concussion and facial fracture during Tennessee's 78–64 win over Florida in the 2021 SEC Tournament, forcing him to miss the remaining two games of the season. As a senior, Fulkerson averaged 9.5 points and 5.5 rebounds per game. He decided to return for a sixth season in April, taking advantage of the NCAA's granting of an additional year of eligibility due to the COVID-19 pandemic. Fulkerson underwent wrist surgery in June 2021.

Professional career
On July 29, 2022, he has signed with Leuven Bears of the BNXT League.

Career statistics

College

|-
| style="text-align:left;"| 2016–17
| style="text-align:left;"| Tennessee
| 10 || 6 || 16.0 || .567 || – || .650 || 4.6 || 1.0 || 1.1 || .9 || 4.7
|-
| style="text-align:left;"| 2017–18
| style="text-align:left;"| Tennessee
| 30 || 1 || 9.3 || .429 || – || .727 || 1.6 || .5 || .5 || .3 || 1.7
|-
| style="text-align:left;"| 2018–19
| style="text-align:left;"| Tennessee
| 36 || 0 || 12.0 || .583 || – || .644 || 2.6 || .7 || .5 || .7 || 3.1
|-
| style="text-align:left;"| 2019–20
| style="text-align:left;"| Tennessee
| 31 || 31 || 30.1 || .612 || .500 || .748 || 5.9 || 1.3 || 1.1 || .9 || 13.7
|-
| style="text-align:left;"| 2020–21
| style="text-align:left;"| Tennessee
| 25 || 24 || 26.4 || .527 || .000 || .747 || 5.5 || 1.7 || .5 || .6 || 9.5
|- class="sortbottom"
| style="text-align:center;" colspan="2"| Career
| 132 || 62 || 18.7 || .567 || .200 || .726 || 3.9 || 1.0 || .7 || .6 || 6.6

See also
 List of NCAA Division I men's basketball career games played leaders

References

External links
Tennessee Volunteers bio

1997 births
Living people
American men's basketball players
Basketball players from Tennessee
Leuven Bears players
People from Kingsport, Tennessee
Power forwards (basketball)
Tennessee Volunteers basketball players
American expatriate basketball people in Belgium